Chink is an English-language ethnic slur usually referring to a person of Chinese descent. The word is also sometimes indiscriminately used against people of East Asian, North Asian and Southeast Asian appearance. The use of the term describing eyes with epicanthic fold ("Asiatic eyes") is considered extremely offensive and highly racist.

Etymology 
Various dictionaries provide different etymologies of the word chink; for example, that it originated from the Chinese courtesy ching-ching, that it evolved from the word China, or that it was an alteration of Qing (Ch'ing), as in the Qing dynasty.

Another possible origin is that chink evolved from the word for China in an Indo-Iranian language, ultimately deriving from the name of the Qing dynasty. That word is now pronounced similarly in various Indo-European languages.

History 

The first recorded use of the word chink is from approximately 1880. As far as is ascertainable, its adjective form, chinky, first appeared in print in 1878.

Around the turn of the 20th century, many White Americans in the Northern United States perceived Chinese immigration as a threat to their living standards. However, Chinese workers were still desired in the Western United States due to persistent labor shortages. Chinese butcher crews were held in such high esteem that when Edmund A. Smith patented his mechanized fish-butchering machine in 1905, he named it the Iron Chink which is seen by some as symbolic of anti-Chinese racism during the era. Usage of the word continued, such as with the story "The Chink and the Child", by Thomas Burke, which was later adapted to film by D. W. Griffith. Griffith altered the story to be more racially sensitive and renamed it Broken Blossoms.

Although chink refers to those appearing to be of Chinese descent, the term has also been directed towards people of other East and Southeast Asian ethnicities. Literature and film about the Vietnam war contain examples of this usage, including the film Platoon (1986) and the play Sticks and Bones (1971, also later filmed).

Controversy

Australia 
The terms Chinaman and chink became intertwined, as some Australians used both with hostile intent when referring to members of the country's Chinese population, which had swelled significantly during the Gold Rush era of the 1850s and 1860s.

Assaults on Chinese miners and racially motivated riots and public disturbances were not infrequent occurrences in Australia's mining districts in the second half of the 19th century. There was some resentment, too, of the fact that Chinese miners and laborers tended to send their earnings back home to their families in China rather than spending them in Australia and supporting the local economy.

In the popular Sydney Bulletin magazine in 1887, one author wrote: "No nigger, no chink, no lascar, no kanaka (laborer from the South Pacific islands), no purveyor of cheap labour, is an Australian." Eventually, since-repealed federal government legislation was passed to restrict non-white immigration and thus protect the jobs of Anglo-Celtic Australian workers from "undesirable" competition.

Canada 
On July 19, 2020, a man in Calgary was arrested after spitting on a woman of Asian descent and shouting "stupid chink" at her. The man, identified as Justin Riaz Williams, was a basketball manager at the University of Calgary who was fired from his job before the COVID-19 pandemic after staff found screenshots of him using homophobic and racial slurs on his phone. Jessica Lau, the victim, uploaded the video on her Instagram account and told Global News, "I've never experienced any kind of racism ... this is a thing that's happening in the world right now." The Calgary Police said that Williams was taken into custody and charged with three counts of assault and one count of possession of a weapon dangerous to the public.

India 
In India, the ethnic slur chinki (or chinky) is frequently directed against people with East Asian features, including people from Northeast India, and Nepal, who are often mistaken for Chinese, despite being closer to Tibetans and the Burmese than to Han Chinese peoples.

In 2012, the Indian Ministry of Home Affairs recognized use of the term "chinki" to refer to a member of the Scheduled Tribes (especially in the North-East) as a criminal offense under the Scheduled Castes and Scheduled Tribes (Prevention of Atrocities) Act with a penalty of up to five years in jail. The Ministry further warned that they would very seriously review any failure of the police to enforce this interpretation of the Act.

United Kingdom 

Chinky (or chinky chonky) is a slur for a Chinese takeaway restaurant or Chinese food and Chinese people. In parts of northern England known as a chinkies, always in the plural. 

The 1969 top 3 UK hit single for Blue Mink, "Melting Pot", has the lyric: "take a pinch of white man/Wrap him up in black skin. [...] Mixed with yellow Chinkees. You know you lump it all together/And you got a recipe for a get-along scene/Oh what a beautiful dream/If it could only come true". The usage of the slur was and still is heavily overlooked due to the song being viewed as “racially inclusive”.

In 1999, an exam given to students in Scotland was criticized for containing a passage that students were told to interpret containing the word chinky. This exam was taken by students all over Scotland, and Chinese groups expressed offence at the use of this passage. The examinations body apologized, calling the passage's inclusion "an error of judgement."

In 2002, the Broadcasting Standards Commission, after a complaint about the BBC One programme The Vicar of Dibley, held that when used as the name of a type of restaurant or meal, rather than as an adjective applied to a person or group of people, the word still carries extreme racist connotation which causes offence particularly to those of East Asian origin.

In 2004, the commission's counterpart, the Radio Authority, apologised for the offence caused by an incident where a DJ on Heart 106.2 used the term.

In a 2005 document commissioned by Ofcom titled "Language and Sexual Imagery in Broadcasting: A Contextual Investigation" their definition of chink was "a term of racial offence/abuse. However, this is polarising. Older and mainly white groups tend to think this is not usually used in an abusive way—e.g., let's go to the Chinky—which is not seen as offensive by those who aren't of East Asian origin; Chinky usually refers to food not a culture or race however, younger people, East Asians, particularly people of Chinese racial background and other non-white ethnic minorities believe the word 'Chinky, Chinkies or Chinkie' to be as insulting as 'paki' or 'nigger'."

In 2006, after several campaigns by the Scottish Executive, more people in Scotland now acknowledge that this name is indirectly racist. , British broadcasting regulator Ofcom considers the word to be "Strongest language, highly unacceptable without strong contextualisation. Seen as derogatory to Chinese people. More mixed views regarding use of the term to mean 'Chinese takeaway'".

In 2014, the term gained renewed attention after a recording emerged of UKIP candidate Kerry Smith referring to a woman of Chinese background as a "chinky bird".

United States 
The Pekin Community High School District 303 teams in Pekin, Illinois were officially known as the "Pekin Chinks" until 1981, when the school administration changed the name to the "Pekin Dragons". The event received national attention.

During early 2000, University of California, Davis experienced a string of racial incidents and crimes between Asian and white students, mostly among fraternities. Several incidents included "chink" and other racial epithets being shouted among groups, including the slurs being used during a robbery and assault on an Asian fraternity by 15 white males. The incidents motivated a school-wide review and protest to get professional conflict resolution and culturally sensitive mediators.

Sarah Silverman appeared on Late Night with Conan O'Brien in 2001, stirring up controversy when the word chink was used without the usual bleep appearing over ethnic slurs on network television. The controversy led Asian activist and community leader Guy Aoki to appear on the talk show Politically Incorrect along with Sarah Silverman. Guy Aoki alleged that Silverman did not believe that the term was offensive.

New York City radio station Hot 97 was criticized for airing the "Tsunami Song". Referring to the 2004 Indian Ocean earthquake, in which over an estimated 200,000 people died, the song used the phrase "screaming chinks" along with other offensive lyrics. The radio station fired a co-host and producer, and indefinitely suspended radio personality Miss Jones, who was later reinstated. Members of the Asian American community said Miss Jones' reinstatement condoned hate speech.

A Philadelphia eatery, Chink's Steaks, created controversy, appearing in Philadelphia Daily News and other newspapers. The restaurant was asked by Asian community groups to change the name. The restaurant was named after the original Jewish-American owner's nickname, "Chink", derived from the ethnic slur due to his "slanty eyes". The restaurant was renamed Joe's in 2013.

In February 2012, ESPN fired one employee and suspended another for using the headline "Chink in the Armor" in reference to Jeremy Lin, an American basketball player of Taiwanese and Chinese descent. While the word chink also refers to a crack or fissure and chink in the armor is an idiom and common sports cliché, referring to a vulnerability, the "apparently intentional" double entendre of its use in reference to an Asian athlete was viewed as offensive.

In September 2019, after it was announced that Shane Gillis would be joining Saturday Night Live as a featured cast member, clips from Gillis' podcast in 2018 resurfaced, in which Gillis made anti-Asian jokes, including using the word "chink". The revelation sparked public outcry, with several outlets noting the disconnect of hiring Gillis along with Bowen Yang, the show's first Chinese American cast member. After Gillis issued what was characterized as a non-apology apology, a spokesperson for Lorne Michaels announced Gillis would be let go prior to his first episode due to the controversy.

In May 2021, Tony Hinchcliffe was videotaped insulting Peng Dang, an Asian American comedian who had introduced Hinchcliffe after performing the previous set at a comedy club in Austin, Texas, by referring to Dang as a "filthy little fucking chink". Dang posted the video on Twitter, resulting in heavy backlash against Hinchliffe, who was subsequently dropped by his agency and removed from several scheduled shows.

See also 

 Ang moh
 Chinaman (term)
 Ching chong
 Coolie
 Gook
 Gweilo
 List of ethnic slurs
 Moke
 Shina
 Slope

References

Sources
 Foster, Harry. A Beachcomber in the Orient. New York: Dodd, Mead and Company, 1930.

Anti-Chinese sentiment
Anti–East Asian slurs
English words